Quazi Nurul Hasan Sohan (born 21 November 1993) is a Bangladeshi cricketer who represents Bangladesh in international stage in all formats. Sohan is well known in Bangladesh for his keeping skills and great flexibility. Sohan is a wicket-keeper batter and plays as a right-handed batter lower down the order. His main role is a hard-hitting finisher. He was born in Khulna, Bangladesh. In July 2022, he was named as the captain of the Twenty20 International (T20I) team for Bangladesh's tour of Zimbabwe.

Domestic career
He has played for Sylhet Super Stars in the Bangladesh Premier League in 2015.

In October 2015, Nurul posted his highest knock of unbeaten 182 against Dhaka Division in 2015-16 National Cricket League which helped Khulna to fightback in the match after being all out for just 117.

He was the leading run-scorer for Sheikh Jamal Dhanmondi Club in the 2017–18 Dhaka Premier Division Cricket League, with 546 runs in 12 matches.

In October 2018, he was named in the squad for the Dhaka Dynamites team, following the draft for the 2018–19 Bangladesh Premier League. He captained Sheikh Jamal Dhanmondi Club in List A and Twenty20 cricket in 2017-18 and 2018–19; they won the inaugural tournament of the Dhaka Premier Division Twenty20 Cricket League in 2018–19.

He was the leading run-scorer for Sheikh Jamal Dhanmondi Club in the 2018–19 Dhaka Premier Division Cricket League tournament, with 524 runs in 16 matches. In November 2019, he was selected to play for the Chattogram Challengers in the 2019–20 Bangladesh Premier League.

International career
He made his Twenty20 International debut for Bangladesh against Zimbabwe on 15 January 2016.

He was added to Bangladesh's One Day International (ODI) in December 2016 as a replacement for the injured Mushfiqur Rahim, for their series against New Zealand. He made his ODI debut for Bangladesh on 29 December 2016 against New Zealand. He made his Test debut in the second Test against New Zealand on 20 January 2017.

In December 2018, he was named as the captain of Bangladesh's team for the 2018 ACC Emerging Teams Asia Cup. In April 2021, he was named in the Bangladesh's preliminary squad for 2-match test series against Sri Lanka.

In June 2021, he was selected to play for Bangladesh across all formats for their tour to Zimbabwe, since he had last played an international match in 2018. He was originally replaced by Mushfiqur Rahim for the T20I series, after he had been one of the leading performers in the 2021 Dhaka Premier Division Twenty20 Cricket League.

In September 2021, he was named in Bangladesh's squad for the 2021 ICC Men's T20 World Cup.

References

External links

1993 births
Living people
Bangladeshi cricketers
Bangladesh Test cricketers
Bangladesh One Day International cricketers
Bangladesh Twenty20 International cricketers
People from Khulna District
People from Khulna
Mohammedan Sporting Club cricketers
Prime Bank Cricket Club cricketers
Cricket Coaching School cricketers
Bangladesh Central Zone cricketers
Bangladesh South Zone cricketers
Chattogram Challengers cricketers
Dhaka Division cricketers
Khulna Division cricketers
Bangladesh under-23 cricketers
Rajshahi Royals cricketers
Sylhet Strikers cricketers
Sheikh Jamal Dhanmondi Club cricketers
Wicket-keepers